Marie Pascale Menage (born 16 June 1967) is a Mauritian windsurfer. She competed in the women's Lechner A-390 event at the 1992 Summer Olympics.

References

External links
 

1967 births
Living people
Mauritian female sailors (sport)
Mauritian windsurfers
Olympic sailors of Mauritius
Sailors at the 1992 Summer Olympics – Lechner A-390
Place of birth missing (living people)
Female windsurfers